Albert II, Duke of Brunswick-Lüneburg (1 November 1419 – 15 August 1485), was a Prince of Grubenhagen; he reigned from 1440 until his death in 1485.

Albert II was the third son of Duke Eric I and Elizabeth of Brunswick-Göttingen, a daughter of Otto the Bad, Duke of Brunswick-Göttingen.  He was a grandson of the Duke Albert I, was still a minor when his father died on 27 May 1427.  His first cousin once removed, Duke Otto the Younger of Grubenhagen-Osterode served until 1440 as regent for Albert II and his brothers Henry III and Ernest II.  After 1440, the three brothers, following the Grubenhagen tradition, ruled jointly until Henry died in 1464.  After the death of Henry III, Ernest II joined the clergy and Albert II became sole ruler and regent for Henry III's son, Henry IV.

Albert II was repeatedly involved in feuds. For example, in 1477, Duke William IV the Younger of Göttingen got into a dispute with the city of Einbeck (in the Duchy of Grubenhagen) and in 1479, he encamped his army before the town. The citizens of Einbeck came out to fight him in an open field. Duke William lured them into an ambush and defeated them completely. According to the chroniclers, more than 300 citizens were killed and over 800 were captured and brought to William's Hardegsen Castle. Albert and William settled their dispute on 5 December 1479 in Göttingen, without a battle.

Henry IV came of age in 1479 and agreed with his uncle on a division of their territory.  Albert kept Herzberg Castle and Osterode Castle, while Henry received Heldenburg Castle.  The towns of Einbeck and Osterode were ruled jointly.

Albrecht was married with Elizabeth, daughter of Count Wolrad I of Waldeck.  She gave birth to his three sons and a daughter Sophie, who died at age 6.  His son Ernest died shortly after Albert himself died.  Albert was succeeded in government by his son Philip I, while his son Eric became Bishop of Osnabrück and Paderborn.  In 1532, Eric was elected Bishop of Münster, but he died on May 14 of that year, before he had been confirmed.

Albert died in 1485 and was buried in Osterode am Harz.

Ancestors

References  and sources
 

Princes of Grubenhagen
1419 births
1485 deaths
15th-century German people
Old House of Brunswick